Anna Aleksandrovna Tarshis (25 June 1942 – 10 March 2014), better known as Ry Nikonova or Rea Nikonova, was a Russian artist, poet, and writer. Many of her artworks are held in private and public collections throughout the world.

Nikonova was a main theoretical thinker behind Transfurism movement as well as a prominent figure in mail art history. Her literary and visual works were published in Russia, Spain, US, and other countries. She was an editor of samizdat magazines Transponans and Double. She founded "Uktuss School" art movement in Yekaterinburg, Russia.

Biography

Early life
RyNikonova was born Anna Aleksandrovna Tarshis on 25 June 1942 in Yeysk, which was occupied by Nazi Germany at the time. She was born into a very artistic family who saw playing piano, singing, and composing music as normal after-work entertainment. She graduated from Yekaterinburg Music College in 1961, then entered Saint Petersburg State Theatre Arts Academy in 1965. She was expelled in 1967, because her paintings were non-conformant to the communist standards of that day.

She married Serge Segay in 1966. Their families were tied together by friendship forged during exile; his grandmother and her grandcousin were exiled together to Kazakhstan by Stalin. Introduced by their parents, they became close by discussing each other's artwork and remained married until her death in 2014.

Uktuss School (Yekaterinburg)
She founded "Uktuss School" art movement in Yekaterinburg, Russia. They were creating abstract art and experimented with avant-garde poetry and writing. She also found samizdat journal "Nomer". Many artworks from that era now are in possession of Russian collector Vadim Yegorov. In 1971 she creates first visual poems. Then she creates first vacuum poems, and first poems in form of tables.

Transfurism (Yeysk, Saint-Petersburg)

In 1974, she moves to Yeysk with her husband. They start publishing samizdat journal Transponans in 1979, in 5 copies. They entertain numerous guests from both Russian capitals, creating art and poetry in collaboration. Their Yeysk abode becomes the cultural centre for Russian art and literature underground. They also make performances in Saint-Petersburg, Tambov, Kiev, Moscow during these years. She becomes a key thinker in experimental, avant-garde literature - in 1976 she starts creating artist books (book-halves, spiral books), in 1978 - first vector poems. A lot of people saw her "gesture poems" during performances in Berlin and Budapest.

Her drawings and paintings during this period are much softer than Serge Segay's, with smooth lines and not many sharp edges. Yet they feel blue, sometimes reflecting "no-escape" reality of living in USSR, e.g. famous "Life in a Jar" series of drawings.

In 1991, she starts publishing another samizdat journal, "Double".

Mail art
Ry Nikonova joins Mail art movement in 1985. In 1989, she organized "Scarecrow" mail art exhibition in Yeysk, Russia. She corresponds with numerous artists around the world, including Robin Crozier, John M. Bennett, Guy Bleus, Shozo Shimamoto and others. She also participates in many Mail art projects.

Late period (Kiel)
She emigrated to Germany together with her husband in 1998. Initial efforts of integration were thwarted by diagnosis of cancer, which she subsequently fought for 10 years. She  participated in Mail art projects, created visual poetry, sound poetry and a few paintings. Most importantly, she continued work on her yet unpublished theoretical tome "The System", which purpose is to enumerate all imaginable styles and approaches to art.

Death
On 10 March 2014, at the age of 71, Nikonova died in the German city of Kiel. She was buried in the Scottish village of Leslie.

Exhibitions

 Mail Art: The Artists from 25 Countries, Yeysk Art School, Yeysk, Russia (1989)
 First International Exhibition of Concrete Poetry in the USSR, Yeysk State Museum of History and Local Lore, Yeysk, Russia (1990)

References and sources
References

Sources
 Chuck Welch (Ed.), Eternal Network: A Mail Art Anthology Calgary: University of Calgary Press, 1995. .
 John Held Jr., Mail Art: An Annotated Bibliography, Metuchen 1991
 Géza Perneczky, The Magazine Network: The Trends of Alternative Art in the Light of Their Periodicals 1968–1988, Köln 1993

External links
  Bibliography of transfurists
  Gallery of Ry Nikonova's paintings
  Gallery of Ry Nikonova's artist books and samizdat publications
  Work and information on Rea Nikonova on IUOMA

20th-century Russian painters
Contemporary painters
Russian women poets
Russian women painters
1942 births
2014 deaths
20th-century Russian poets
20th-century Russian women writers
20th-century Russian women artists
Visual poets